Neuwernsdorf is a village in the municipality of Neuhausen/Erzgeb. in the extreme south of the Saxon district of Mittelsachsen, immediately next to the Czech border by Český Jiřetín and the Rauschenbach Dam.

Literature 
 Festschrift 750 Jahre Cämmerswalde. Reinhard Rodefeld, 1957
 Festschrift 800 Jahre Cämmerswalde. Festausschuss, Reinhold Hegewald, 2007
 Cämmerswalde parish archives
 
 Gazettes for the parishes of Cämmerswalde and Neuhausen/Erzgebirge
 Historisches Ortsnamenbuch von Sachsen. 3 vols., ed. by Ernst Eichler and Hans Walther, worked by Ernst Eichler, Volkmar Hellfritzsch, Hans Walther and Erika Weber (sources and research into Saxon history 21), Berlin 2001, Vol. I, p. 135
 Beschreibende Darstellung der älteren Bau- und Kunstdenkmäler des Königreichs Sachsen, 41 Hefte, Heft 1–15 bearb. von Richard Steche, Heft 16–41 bearb. von Cornelius Gurlitt, Dresden 1882–1923, Heft 3, p. 3

References

External links 
 

Neuhausen, Saxony